The Hôtel de la Chambre des Députés is the meeting place of the Luxembourgish national legislature, the Chamber of Deputies, in Luxembourg City, in southern Luxembourg.

It is located on Krautmaart, an irregularly shaped street in the historic heart of the city, in Ville Haute quarter.  Next to the Chamber is the Grand Ducal Palace, the official residence of the Grand Duke of Luxembourg.  Due to the Hôtel's location, 'Krautmaart' has become a metonym for the Chamber of Deputies itself.

History
Until 1860, the Chamber of Deputies had no regular meeting place, variably holding sessions in the Grand Ducal Palace, Luxembourg City Hall, and the Hôtel du Gouvernement.  For a period after the promulgation of Luxembourg's constitution in 1848, the Chamber met in a primary school in Ettelbruck, in the north of the country.  By the late 1850s, this was becoming untenable, and to restore the Grand Ducal Palace to the use of the Grand Ducal Family, plans were laid for the construction of a dedicated home for the Chamber in 1857 by Antoine Hartmann.  Construction began on 27 July 1858, and the building was inaugurated on 30 October 1860, upon the opening of a new parliamentary session.

During the German occupation during the Second World War, the Chamber of Deputies was suspended and the building's functions made subservient to those of the occupation forces.  The building was turned into the headquarters of the Luxembourgish branch of the Gau Propaganda Office.  The balcony was decorated with a large sign hailing the Heim ins Reich, while, later on, large Swastika flags were flown on the outside.

Between 1997 and 1999, major renovations were undergone, and the building expanded to accommodate the public.  The dilapidated wooden decor was replaced by replicas in the original style, with the structural supports strengthened and reconfigured to comply with more stringent health and safety standards.  Meanwhile, the expansion, to receive the public and perform ancillary functions, was built in a modern style.  During this time, the Chamber convened in the City Hall, just as it had 140 years previously.

Footnotes

External links
 

Palaces in Luxembourg City
Chamber of Deputies (Luxembourg)
Government buildings in Luxembourg
Legislative buildings in Europe
Government buildings completed in 1860
Seats of national legislatures